Bailando por un Sueño 1 was the first Argentine season of Bailando por un Sueño.

The first show of the season aired on April 17, 2006, and was part of the original show broadcast by Showmatch  on Canal 13 and hosted by Marcelo Tinelli. 8 couples competed during 7 weeks, and the winner was revealed on the season finale, on June 1, 2006. The winner of this first season was the actress, producer and comedian Carmen Barbieri, who was paired with the professional dancer Christian Ponce.

The judges were journalist Jorge Lafauci, professional dancer Laura Fidalgo (who later competed on the show), vedette Zulma Faiad, and producer, actress and singer Reina Reech.

Couples

Scoring chart

Red numbers indicate the lowest score for each week.
Green numbers indicate the highest score for each week.
 indicates the couple eliminated that week.
 indicates the couple was saved by the public.
 indicates the couple was eliminated but returned into the competition by the judge's decision.
 indicates the winning couple.
 indicates the runner-up couple.
 indicates the semi-finalists couples.

Highest and lowest scoring performances 
The best and worst performances in each dance according to the judges' marks are as follows:

Argentina
Argentine variety television shows
2006 Argentine television seasons